M-1 is the first commercial radio station in Lithuania, broadcasting from the capital city of Vilnius. The station was established on 31 December 1989 by Hubertas Grušnys.

The first song played on M-1 was "Radio Ga Ga" by Queen.

References

External links

1989 establishments in Lithuania
Radio stations in Lithuania
Mass media in Vilnius